The 2006 UNCAF Interclub Cup was the 24th edition of the international club football competition held in the UNCAF region representing the seven nations of Central America.  This was the eighth year of the current format using the name UNCAF Interclub Cup.  The tournament was also a qualifying event for the 2007 CONCACAF Champions' Cup.  Sixteen teams representing seven football associations took part, beginning with the first qualifying games on August 22, 2006.  The tournament concluded with a two-legged final that was won by Puntarenas of Costa Rica making them the Central American club football champions.  The top three finishers in the tournament qualify for the 2007 CONCACAF Champions' Cup.

Bracket

First round

Alajuelense advance 3-1 on aggregate.

Puntarenas advance 6-1 on aggregate.

Marathón advance 3-1 on aggregate.

Marquense advance 3-0 on aggregate.

Saprissa advance 2-1 on aggregate.

Victoria advance 4-1 on aggregate.

Municipal advance 10-0 on aggregate.

/f match forfeited1- Diriangén used ineligible players, and CONCACAF awarded Olimpia a 3–0 win.1

Olimpia advance 5-1 on aggregate.

Quarterfinals

Puntarenas advance 5-0 on aggregate.

Marquense advance 2-1 on aggregate.

Victoria advance 2-1 on aggregate.

Olimpia advance 4-1 on aggregate.

Semifinals

Puntarenas qualify to 2007 CONCACAF Champions' Cup 2-0 on aggregate.

Olimpia qualify to 2007 CONCACAF Champions' Cup 4-2 on aggregate.

Third place

Marquense qualify to 2007 CONCACAF Champions' Cup 4-1 on aggregate.

Final

Champion Puntarenas of the 2006 UNCAF Club Cup, and runner up Olimpia qualify to 2007 CONCACAF Champions' Cup.

Trivia
At the quarter finals there were 2 clubs with a Monster as team mascot and 3 clubs with a Lion as mascot.
The winning team received $10,000 as a prize

UNCAF Interclub Cup
1
2006–07 in Honduran football
2006–07 in Guatemalan football
2006–07 in Costa Rican football
2006–07 in Salvadoran football
2006–07 in Nicaraguan football
2006–07 in Belizean football
2006–07 in Panamanian football